Novelda Club de Fútbol is a football club based in Novelda, in the Valencian Community in Spain. The Spanish football team was founded in 1925. For the 2022-23 season it plays in the Regional Preferente – Group 4 (the sixth level) holding home games at Estadio La Magdalena, which has a capacity of 5,000 seats.

Novelda was initially folded on 8 June 2018 after merging with Intercity Alicante. However, the merger was not accepted by RFEF and thus, Novelda did not fold and remained in the league.

History 
The first football games were played in Novelda in the 1915-17. The teams consisted of students and took place during holiday breaks.

Season to season

8 seasons in Segunda División B
43 seasons in Tercera División

Famous players
Note: this list contains players that have played at least 100 league games and/or have reached international status.
 Kily

References

External links
Official website 
Futbolme team profile 

 
Football clubs in the Valencian Community
Association football clubs established in 1925
1925 establishments in Spain